Makan Samabaly (born 11 June 1995) is a Malian footballer who plays as a midfielder for Real Bamako and the Mali national team.

International career
Diarra made his professional debut with the Mali national team in a 4–0 2020 African Nations Championship qualification win over Guinea Bissau on 27 February 2019.

References

External links
 
 

1995 births
Living people
Sportspeople from Bamako
Malian footballers
Mali international footballers
Association football midfielders
Malian Première Division players
Championnat National 2 players
Malian expatriate footballers
Malian expatriate sportspeople in France
Expatriate footballers in France
21st-century Malian people
Mali A' international footballers
2020 African Nations Championship players
AS Real Bamako players
2022 African Nations Championship players